Paul Bernard Schmidt (23 April 1917 – 17 June 1961) was an Australian rules footballer who played with Carlton in the VFL.

Schmidt was a half forward, he topped Carlton goalkicking every season from 1940 to 1942. His best season tally came in 1941 when he managed 77 goals, including 11 in Carlton's Round 16 game against St Kilda. He was a premiership player in 1938 and missed the 1943 season due to military commitments.

Schmidt moved to Tasmania to captain-coach the Devonport Football Club in the North West Football Union in 1945.

References

External links

Blueseum profile

1917 births
1961 deaths
Australian rules footballers from Victoria (Australia)
Carlton Football Club players
Carlton Football Club Premiership players
Devonport Football Club players
One-time VFL/AFL Premiership players
Australian military personnel of World War II